The women's 5 km free competition of the 2014 Winter Paralympics was held at Laura Biathlon & Ski Complex near Krasnaya Polyana, Sochi. The competition took place on 16 March 2014.

Medal table

Standing

Sitting

Visually impaired

See also
Cross-country skiing at the 2014 Winter Olympics

References

Women's 5 km
Para